Middle Assyrian refers to the Middle Assyrian period of the Ancient Near East, ca. 16th to 10th centuries BC (the Late Bronze Age). It may refer to:
The Middle Assyrian Empire
The Middle Assyrian language, see Akkadian language
Middle Assyrian cuneiform, see Cuneiform script

See also
Old Assyrian (disambiguation) (Middle Bronze Age)
Neo-Assyrian (Early Iron Age)